Miyabi Moriya (born 22 August 1996) is a Japanese professional footballer who plays as a defender for WE League club INAC Kobe Leonessa.

Club career 
Moriya made her WE League debut on 26 September 2021.

References 

Japanese women's footballers
INAC Kobe Leonessa players
WE League players
1996 births
Living people
Women's association football defenders
Association football people from Nara Prefecture